The Gaelic revival was the late-nineteenth-century revival of interest in the Irish language and Irish Gaelic culture.

Gaelic revival may also refer to:
 The Gaelic Resurgence, an important factor in the History of Ireland, a 14th-century Gaelicisation of parts of Ireland previously under Anglo-Norman influence 
 The current Revival of the status of the Irish language
 Scottish Gaelic Renaissance, 19th-century 
 Scottish Gaelic revitalisation, goal continuing to the present
 The current Revival of the Manx language, begun in the 20th century

See also
 Language revitalization
 Celtic Revival, overlapped with the Gaelic revival 
 Gaelic (disambiguation)